Càlig is a municipality in the comarca of Baix Maestrat in the Valencian Community, Spain.

The town is located at the centre of the comarca. It is an agricultural town surrounded by cultivated plots, as well as almond tree and olive tree fields. There are not so many fruit and orange trees in its term. Càlig is part of the Taula del Sénia free association of municipalities.

References

External links 

 Institut Valencià d'Estadística.
 Portal de la Direcció General d'Administració Local de la Generalitat.

Municipalities in the Province of Castellón
Baix Maestrat